Griffiths-Priday State Park (formerly Griffiths-Priday Ocean State Park) is a  state-operated, public recreation area at the mouth of the Copalis River on the Pacific Ocean in Grays Harbor County, Washington. The park includes the Copalis Spit, a small peninsula that serves as refuge for migratory birds. Park activities include picnicking, fishing, clam digging, beachcombing, birdwatching, mountain biking, and wildlife viewing, including migratory gray whales.

References

External links 
Griffiths-Priday State Park Washington State Parks and Recreation Commission 
Griffiths-Priday State Park Map Washington State Parks and Recreation Commission

State parks of Washington (state)
Parks in Grays Harbor County, Washington